Code page 1013 (CCSID 1013), also known as CP1013, is the code page for the United Kingdom version of ISO 646 (ISO 646-GB / IR-4), specified in BS 4730.

Code page layout

See also
 Code page 1101 (similar DEC NRCS code page)

References

1013